The 1960–61 Northern Rugby Football League season was the 66th season of rugby league football.

Season summary

Leeds won their first Championship when they defeated Warrington 25-10 in the play-off final.

The Challenge Cup winners were St. Helens who beat Wigan 12-6 in the final.

Swinton won the Lancashire League, and Leeds won the Yorkshire League. St. Helens beat Swinton 15–9 to win the Lancashire County Cup, and Wakefield Trinity beat Huddersfield 16–10 to win the Yorkshire County Cup.

Championship

Play-offs

Championship final

This match was Warrington loose forward Albert Naughton's last appearance.

Challenge Cup

St Helens reached the Challenge Cup Final by beating Widnes 29–10 on 16 Feb away in round one after a 5–5 draw at home on 11 Feb; Castleford 18–10 away in round two on 25 Feb; Swinton 17–9 at home in the quarter-finals on 11 Mar and Hull 26–9 on neutral ground in the semi-final on 15 Apr.

St Helens beat Wigan 12–6 (5–2 at Half Time) in the Final played at Wembley Stadium in front of a crowd of 94,672 on 13 May 1961.  St Helens’ points were scored by Alex Murphy (try), Tom van Vollenhoven (try) and Austin Rhodes (one conversion and two drop goals).  The Lance Todd Trophy winner was St Helens' second-row forward, Dick Huddart.

This was St Helens’ second Challenge Cup Final win in six Final appearances.

References

Sources
1960-61 Rugby Football League season at wigan.rlfans.com
The Challenge Cup at The Rugby Football League website

1960 in English rugby league
1961 in English rugby league
Northern Rugby Football League seasons